Washington Township is a township in Clinton County, Iowa, USA.  As of the 2000 census, its population was 460.

History
Washington Township was organized in 1856. It is named for George Washington.

Geography
According to the USGS, it contains four cemeteries: Clinton County Farm, Rossiter, Saint Patricks and White.

References

 USGS Geographic Names Information System (GNIS)

External links
 US-Counties.com
 City-Data.com

Townships in Clinton County, Iowa
Townships in Iowa
1856 establishments in Iowa
Populated places established in 1856